Tesoro or El Tesoro may refer to:

People
Ashley Tesoro (born 1983), American actress, model, and singer
Tesoro Ministry Foundation, a charity
Donya Tesoro (born 1991), a Filipina politician 
Giuliana Tesoro (1921–2002), Italian-born American chemist
Kermit Tesoro (born 1988), a Filipino designer
Laura Tesoro (born 1996), Belgian singer and actress
Michelle Tesoro, American film editor

Places
Tesoro railway station, in Bari, Italy
Camp El Tesoro, a camp in Granbury, Texas, U.S.
El Tesoro, Maldonado, Uruguay
Monte Tesoro, a summit of the Bergamasque Prealps in Italy
 Tesoro, a station on Line 1 of the Guadalajara light rail system

Other uses
Tesoro Corporation, later known as Andeavor, an American oil and gas company
Dipartimento del Tesoro, or simply "Tesoro", the Italian department of treasury
Tesoro High School, in Las Flores, California, U.S.
Tesoro, a 13th-century translation of Li Livres dou tresor by Brunetto Latini
El tesoro, a 2016 Colombian telenovela 
El Tesoro tequila, a Mexican brand

See also

Mi Tesoro (disambiguation)
Casa del Tesoro (Madrid), a former building in Madrid, Spain
El Nuevo Tesoro de la Juventud, a Spanish-language encyclopedia